The 1973 Major League Baseball season was the first season of the designated hitter rule in the American League.

American League umpires began wearing red blazers with blue pants, a change from the navy blue coats and gray pants worn from 1968 to 1972. The red blazers were worn through 1979. 

California Angels ace pitcher Nolan Ryan broke Sandy Koufax's 1965 strikeout record of 382 when he struck out 383 batters during the season.

The Oakland Athletics won their second straight World Series championship in seven games over the New York Mets.

The Kansas City Royals moved their home games from Municipal Stadium to the new Royals Stadium (adjacent to the Chiefs' football facility) and also hosted the All-Star Game on July 24 with the NL defeating the AL, 7–1.

The New York Yankees played their final season at the original Yankee Stadium before the stadium closed for remodeling during the 1974 and 1975 seasons.

On June 19, Pete Rose of the Cincinnati Reds and Willie Davis of the Los Angeles Dodgers both collect their 2000th career hit. It was a single for Rose against the San Francisco Giants while Davis hit a home run against the Atlanta Braves.

A lockout in the offseason (February 8–25) did not result in any regular season games being canceled, but the start of spring training was delayed.

Awards and honors
Baseball Hall of Fame
Roberto Clemente
Billy Evans
Monte Irvin
George Kelly
Warren Spahn
Mickey Welch
Most Valuable Player
Reggie Jackson (AL) Oakland Athletics
Pete Rose (NL) Cincinnati Reds
Cy Young Award
Jim Palmer (AL) Baltimore Orioles
Tom Seaver (NL) New York Mets
Rookie of the Year
Al Bumbry (AL) Baltimore Orioles
Gary Matthews (NL) San Francisco Giants
Gold Glove Award
George Scott (1B) (AL) 
Bobby Grich (2B) (AL) 
Brooks Robinson (3B) (AL) 
Mark Belanger (SS) (AL) 
Paul Blair (OF) (AL) 
Amos Otis (OF) (AL) 
Mickey Stanley (OF) (AL)
Thurman Munson (C) (AL) 
Jim Kaat (P) (AL)

Standings

American League

National League

Postseason

Bracket

Statistical leaders

Home Field Attendance

References

External links
1973 Major League Baseball season schedule at Baseball Reference

 
Major League Baseball seasons